The Men's 100 metre breaststroke swimming events for the 2020 Summer Paralympics took place at the Tokyo Aquatics Centre from August 26 to September 1, 2021. A total of 10 events were contested over this distance.

Schedule

Medal summary
The following is a summary of the medals awarded across all 100 metre breaststroke events.

Results
The following were the results of the finals only of each of the Men's 100 metre breaststroke events in each of the classifications. Further details of each event, including where appropriate heats and semi finals results, are available on that event's dedicated page.

SB4

The SB4 category is for swimmers who have hemiplegia, paraplegia or short stature.

The final in this classification took place on 29 August 2021:

SB5

The SB5 category is for swimmers who have short stature, arm amputations, or some form of coordination problem on one side of their body.

The final in this classification took place on 28 August 2021:

SB6

The SB6 category is for swimmers who have one leg and one arm amputation on opposite side, or paralysis on one side of their body. These swimmers have full control of their arms and trunk but variable function in their legs.

The final in this classification took place on 28 August 2021:

SB7

The SB7 category is for swimmers who have a single amputation, or restrictive movement in their hip, knee and ankle joints.

The final in this classification took place on 1 September 2021:

SB8

The SB8 category is for swimmers who have joint restrictions in one leg, or double below-the-knee amputations.

The final in this classification took place on 26 August 2021:

SB9

The SB9 category is for swimmers who have minor physical impairments, for example, loss of one hand.

The final in this classification took place on 26 August 2021:

SB11

The SB11 category is for swimmers who have severe visual impairments and have very low or no light perception, such as blindness, they are required to wear blackened goggles to compete. They use tappers when competing in swimming events.

The final in this classification took place on 1 September 2021:

SB12

The SB12 category is for swimmers who have moderate visual impairment and have a visual field of less than 5 degrees radius. They are required to wear blackened goggles to compete. They may wish to use a tapper.

The final in this classification took place on 1 September 2021:

SB13

The SB13 category is for swimmers who have minor visual impairment and have high visual acuity. They are required to wear blackened goggles to compete. They may wish to use a tapper.

The final in this classification took place on 1 September 2021:

SB14

The SB14 category is for swimmers who have an intellectual impairment.

The final in this classification took place on 29 August 2021:

References

Swimming at the 2020 Summer Paralympics